Abby Davies is a fictional character from the British soap opera Hollyoaks, played by Helen Noble. The character made her first on-screen appearance on 18 April 2000. Noble remained a part of the cast until her character departed in June 2004. She made reprised role for a guest return on 5 September 2005.

Casting
Helen Noble was seventeen when she joined the cast of Hollyoaks after auditioning for the role. Helen Noble quit in 2004, but agreed to return in four episodes in 2005. Noble stated that she felt she had changed and was confident in her decision to depart.

Development
Abby is an enthusiast and has high hopes in her life. Speaking of Abby's persona during an interview with OK! Noble stated: "My character Abby Davies was such a fun character, very likeable, very girlie, a little bit ditzy and silly. She had a big imagination and she had very high hopes for herself and her love life." Abby has a unique style but Noble disliked it. She told a reporter from Inside Soap that "[she] is supposed to be a goth/punky kind of person and she used to wear dog collars – but I think they're really ugly. They're for dogs, not people. And if we're filming, and I have to have this heavy studded thing on all day, it gets really uncomfortable! Abby's style is just not me at all." Eventually Abby began to change her appearance. Noble told Kathryn Secretan from Soaplife that Abby's "fashion sense used to be horrible. She used to dress like a punk and I hated it."

Writers created a relationship storyline between Abby and fellow student, Lee (Alex Carter). Their relationship is tested when Abby leaves Chester to study at Brighton University. Lee remains in Hollyoaks and decides to take a beautician college course at the local campus. The pair also become engaged to marry, but a long distance relationship begins to cause problems. Carter told reporters from All About Soap that "Lee is definitely missing Abby. Well, you would, they've just got engaged." Lee sends Abby text messages but she does not reply and Carter explained that Lee assumes that Abby is cheating on him. When Abby finally makes contact with Lee, their friend Zara Morgan (Kelly Greenwood) interferes and asks Abby how many new men she has met. Zara tries to cheer Lee up, but he cannot stop thinking about Abby. Carter said that viewers would soon tire of his character's whining about Abby.

Storylines
Will's daughter and Ben's younger sister Abby was the school friend of Lisa Hunter, Lee, Zara, Cameron Clark, and Norman Sankofa. Abby's main storylines involved her tempestuous relationship with Lee. No matter how many times they broke up, Abby could always be won back by Lee quoting Romeo and Juliet, though this didn't stop her almost starting a relationship with Craig Dean. Lee finally asked Abby to marry him shortly before she left Hollyoaks to go to university in Brighton, but alas, it was not to be. When she stopped calling, Lee executed a surprise visit, only to find her in bed with someone else. Abby was last mentioned in October 2007, when Steph Dean complained about still living in Chester while Abby was living in the more glamorous Los Angeles.

Reception
Lorna Cooper of MSN TV listed Anna of one of Soap Opera's "forgotten characters" and that she is mainly remembered for her "turbulent relationship with Lee Hunter". Virgin Media said that the "ever-bubbly and ditzy" was an "absolute sucker" for Lee, adding that their relationship status seemed more on/off than a "faulty light switch".

References

Hollyoaks characters
Television characters introduced in 2000
Female characters in television